

Winners and nominees

1990s

2000s

2010s

2020s

Records 
Most awarded actors: Jorge Poza and Jesús Ochoa, 2 times.
Most nominated actors: Jorge Poza, Luis Roberto Guzmán, René Casados, Jesús Ochoa, Alejandro Ibarra and Pablo Valentín with 2 nominations.
 Actors winning all nominations: Jorge Poza, Jesús Ochoa, and Arturo Barba.
 Most nominated actors without a win: René Casados, Alejandro Ibarra and Pablo Valentín with 2 nominations.
 Younger winner: Jorge Poza, 24 years old.
 Youngest nominee: Héctor Suárez Gomis, 23 years old.
 Oldest winner: Jesús Ochoa, 54 years old.
 Oldest nominee: Aarón Hernán, 84 years old.
 Actor winning after short time: Jesús Ochoa by (Para volver a amar, 2011) and (Por ella soy Eva, 2013), 2 years difference.
 Actor winning after long time: Jorge Poza by (El Manantial, 2002) and (Alma de Hierro, 2009), 7 years difference.
 Actors winning this category, despite having been as a main villain: Salvador Pineda (Mi pequeña Soledad, 1991)
 Actors was nominated in this category, despite having played as a main villain:
 Guillermo García Cantú (La intrusa, 2002)
 Agustín Arana (Palabra de mujer, 2009)
 David Zepeda (Soy tu dueña, 2011)
 Rafael Sánchez Navarro (La candidata, 2017)
Foreign winning actors:
 Otto Sirgo from Cuba
 Luis Roberto Guzmán from Puerto Rico

References

External links 
TVyNovelas at esmas.com
TVyNovelas Awards at the univision.com

Co-lead